Nathan Tyson (born 1982) is an English professional footballer.

Nathan Tyson may also refer to:

 Nathan Tyson (Quaker) (died 1867), Baltimore Quaker merchant and husband of Martha Ellicott Tyson
 Nathan Tyson (Neighbours), a fictional character on the Australian television series Neighbours

See also
 Nathan Tysen (born 1977), an award-winning songwriter and Broadway lyricist